John C. Miller (born 1978) is an American businessman and attorney serving as the CEO of CaliBurger and its parent company CaliGroup.

Early life and education
John C. Miller was raised in Los Angeles. Miller has a bachelor's degree in economics from the University of Redlands. After graduating from Stanford Law School with a JD, Miller was admitted to the California Bar.

Career
Miller was vice president of intellectual property at a public pharmaceutical company, Arrowhead Pharmaceuticals, from 2004 to 2010. He co-authored a book called The Handbook of Nanotechnology: Business, Policy, and Intellectual Property Law.

After spending time working in Asia, Miller founded Pasadena-based technology company CaliGroup. CaliGroup's new technology is trialled at the CaliBurger chain of restaurants, offering solutions for "food production, delivery, take out and drive thru". They have invested in gaming to make the restaurant experience more entertaining. Robotics, created by the subsidiary Miso Robotics, are used in the kitchen to fry burgers. Through the Cali Group subsidiary PopID, facial recognition software allows customers to place orders and pay.

Miller believes the "restaurant industry has come under attack from increasing costs" and aims to use robotics to "drive down costs associated with labor, especially turnover." He remarked: "Millenials that we hire don't tend to stay very long. They come in, we train them, they work for a while, then go drive an Uber and go home and play competitive video games".

In a Fox News interview in 2017, Miller said the robotic technology increased the quality, consistency and hygiene standards of food as "robots don't spit in food or contaminate food." He said employees' strengths were related to "social interaction" with customers. In response to the COVID-19 pandemic in 2020, Miller said body thermometer devices would check for feverish temperatures as customers entered CaliBurger's Pasadena store.

In 2020, Miller was included on Nation's Restaurant News' Power List.

CaliBurger

CaliBurger is a fast-food restaurant with West Coast-styled fries, burgers, and milkshakes. The menu in certain locations includes vegan options with sauces and cheese, and patties by Beyond Meat. Spiked milkshakes, beer, and wine are available at select locations.

The company has a broad international presence, with locations in the United States, Mexico, China, Kuwait, Malaysia, Philippines, Qatar, Saudi Arabia, Spain, Sweden, Taiwan, and United Arab Emirates.

CaliBurger was sued by In-N-Out Burger in 2012 for selling "Animal Style" fries and serving milkshakes in palm-tree-print cups; the lawsuit was settled and CaliBurger agreed to change their menu and decor.

Restaurant kitchen robotics
CaliBurger uses a robotic device named "Flippy" in its restaurants for certain types of food preparation. An upgraded version called "Flippy Robot-on-a-Rail" or "Flippy ROAR" was announced in October 2020. It is being implemented in 50 CaliBurger locations. In 2018, a Flippy robot was installed in food concession in Dodgers Stadium. In July 2020, White Castle began trials with a Flippy robot in one of their restaurants in Chicago.

In 2020, Miso Robotics, a subsidiary of the CaliGroup, unveiled the next generation kitchen robot called Flippy 2.0, which is faster and more versatile than the previous model. Time magazine called it one of the best inventions of 2022. In 2022, Flippy 2.0 was installed in 100 White Castle locations and Jack in the Box began trials at a single location in San Diego.

Personal life
Miller married violinist Caroline Campbell in April 2005. He filed for divorce in June 2011, but they reconciled the following February. They filed divorce papers again in October 2014. In October 2016, they agreed to joint legal custody of their daughter Violet and son Quest. The divorce was finalized in November 2018.

Miller dated actress Jennifer Garner from mid-2018 to early 2020. According to sources and paparazzi photos, they restarted their relationship in April 2021 and have been together since.

References 

Living people
American company founders
American chief executives of food industry companies
University of Redlands alumni
Stanford Law School alumni
1978 births